Marc Elsen (born 1960) is a Belgian politician and a member of the cdH. He was elected as a member of the Belgian Senate in 2007.

Notes

Living people
Centre démocrate humaniste politicians
Members of the Senate (Belgium)
1960 births
21st-century Belgian politicians